Luzzogno is a frazione (and parish ) of the municipality of Valstrona, in Piedmont, northern Italy.

Overview

It is a village located some km from the main road of the Valle Strona, on the left side of Strona river.

Since 1928 it was a separate comune (municipality).

Naming 
Luzzogno should come from the latin Lux-omnium (light of everybody, or light of all the valley) or from Lucus-Usium, literally Usi's forest, being the Usi the old inhabitants of the area.

References

External links

Frazioni of Valstrona
Former municipalities of the Province of Verbano-Cusio-Ossola